Campbell Gray Living is a 70 metres tall up-scale commercial residential tower, located in the district of Al-Abdali, in Amman, Jordan. It is part of Abdali Project. The tower features luxurious apartments, offices, restaurants, gym, spa and a pool deck. Orange Jordan signed an agreement to provide all telecommunication services to this project  Campbell Gray Amman is a mirror hotel tower right next to the project.

References

Buildings and structures in Amman